
 
 

Monarto Conservation Park is a protected area located in the Australian state of South Australia in the suburb of Monarto South about  south-east of the state capital of Adelaide and about  south-west of the town of Murray Bridge.

The conservation park consists of land in sections 495 and 496 in the cadastral unit of the Hundred of Monarto. It was proclaimed under the National Parks and Wildlife Act 1972 on 15 September 1983.

The above-described land which was previously known as Braendlers Scrub was part of the site for the now-abandoned city of Monarto. The land had been subject to some clearing activity prior to 1983, but was considered in 2000 as having “regenerated well” and was also reported as being “known for its prolific flowering plants.”

Vegetation in the eastern part of the conservation park was surveyed in 1992 and subsequently described as an "Open Mallee" dominated by Eucalyptus incrassata and Eucalyptus socialis over an understorey dominated by Hysterobaeckea behrii. The survey whose site was on a dune crest identified 50 species of native plant and one species of introduced plants within its boundary.

The conservation park is classified as an IUCN Category III protected area.

See also
Protected areas of South Australia
Ferries McDonald Conservation Park

References

External links
Monarto Conservation Park official webpage
Monarto Conservation Park webpage on the Protected Planet website
Monarto Conservation Park webpage on the BirdsSA website

Conservation parks of South Australia
Protected areas established in 1983
1983 establishments in Australia